Francesco Lana de Terzi (1631 in Brescia, Lombardy – 22 February 1687, in Brescia, Lombardy) was an Italian Jesuit priest, mathematician, naturalist and aeronautics pioneer. Having been professor of physics and mathematics at Brescia, he first sketched the concept for a vacuum airship and has been referred to as the Father of Aeronautics for his pioneering efforts, turning the aeronautics field into a science by establishing "a theory of aerial navigation verified by mathematical accuracy".  He also developed the idea that developed into Braille.

Airship design 

In the year 1670 Francesco Lana de Terzi published a book titled Prodromo, including a chapter titled saggio di alcune invenzioni nuove premesso all'arte maestra ("Essay on new inventions premised on the master art"), which contained the description of a “flying ship”. Encouraged by the experiments of Otto von Guericke with the Magdeburg hemispheres, in 1663 Lana de Terzi developed an idea for a lighter than air vessel.

His design had a central mast to which a sail was attached, and four masts which had thin copper foil spheres attached to them: the air would be pumped out of the spheres, leaving a vacuum inside, and so being lighter than the surrounding air, would provide lift. The airship would be steered like a sailing boat.  Each sphere would have had a diameter of 7.5  m (24 ft 7 in). Terzi calculated that the weight of a sphere would be 180 kg (396 lb).  He also calculated that the air in the sphere would weigh 290 kg (638 lb), and would provide enough lift to carry 6 passengers.
At the time no one could manufacture such thin copper foil and the pressure of the surrounding air would have collapsed the spheres. In addition, Francesco Lana de Terzi was aware that one could use such a vehicle as a weapon of war, and attack cities from the air. He wrote: “God will never allow that such a machine be built…because everybody realises that no city would be safe from raids…iron weights, fireballs and bombs could be hurled from a great height".

The fact that these vacuum spheres were physically impossible was proven in 1710 by Gottfried William Leibniz, and such a vessel has never been built.  Although Leibniz's conclusion was made based on the materials known at the time, the discovery of graphene and recent advances in its production may render this conclusion obsolete.  A model of Lana de Terzi's invention is on display at the Smithsonian National Air and Space Museum in Washington, D.C.

Lana de Terzi's idea was discussed in Leibniz's Hypothesis physica nova (1671). In 1671 a review by Henry Oldenburg of the Prodromus appeared in the Philosophical Transactions. Robert Hooke, the Curator of the Royal Society, presented an English translation of certain sections of the Prodromo, together with a long discussion of the theories involved.

Blind writing alphabet 

In his book Prodromo he also introduced an entirely new alphabet for blind people of his own invention. Unlike previous blind writing systems, Lana's alphabet was based on the idea that it did not have to mimic the regular handwritten or printed letters, but had to be based on signs (dashes) that could be recognized by the touch of one's fingers. The one detail which prevented the success of this invention is that Lana failed to understand that dots were more easily recognizable than dashes by the touch. Louis Braille made this fundamental intuition and devised the blind writing alphabet that was named after him.

Works 
 
  (Ristampa: Milano, Longanesi, 1977)

See also 

 List of Roman Catholic scientist-clerics

References

External links
 
 
 

1631 births
1687 deaths
People from Brescia
17th-century Italian Jesuits
Italian aerospace engineers
Year of birth uncertain
Catholic clergy scientists
Jesuit scientists